is a Japanese actress, singer and martial artist. she is best known for playing Kei Tsuchiya in High Kick Girl! she hold her black belt in Ryukyu Shōrin-ryū Karate.

Life and career
Takeda was born on June 15, 1991, in Kanagawa Prefecture. She has said that she became interested in karate as a 10-year-old when she saw her father lose in a karate match and decided that she had to avenge his defeat. In June 2008, the 17-year-old Takeda demonstrated her skills at her dojo for Shaolin Girl producer Fuyuhiko Nishi, and he was impressed enough to invite her to audition for the movie High Kick Girl!. Takeda won the starring role as Kei Tsuchiya in the movie which was released in May 2009. In late 2010, Takeda appeared on television in the MBS comedy tokusatsu series The Ancient Dogoo Girl as Doro-chan.

Takeda had her second starring movie role in the February 2011 martial arts action film Karate Girl together with Tobimatsu Hina followed by another action film The Kunoichi: Ninja Girl in March 2011. In 2012, Takeda starred in a different genre of filmmaking with Dead Sushi, a comic horror movie directed by Noboru Iguchi, who had earlier directed her in The Ancient Dogoo Girl. The film had its US premier at the 2012 Austin Fantastic Fest where Takeda won the Best Actress award. Takeda and director Iguchi were both present at the festival. She worked with Iguchi again in the action film Gothic Lolita Battle Bear, released theatrically in Japan in January 2014.

Also in 2014, Takeda co-starred with Rumi Hanai in the science fiction fantasy Danger Dolls directed by Shusuke Kaneko.

Filmography

Films
High Kick Girl! (2009) as Kei Tsuchiya
 (2010)
Karate Girl (2011) as Ayaka Kurenai/Ayaka Ikegami
The Kunoichi: Ninja Girl (2011) as Kisaragi
Dead Sushi (2012) as Keiko
The Tale of Iya (2013) as Haruna
Gothic Lolita Battle Bear (2014) as Kill Billy; Nuigurumaa
Danger Dolls (2014) as Rei
Attack on Titan (2015) as Lil
The Book Peddler (2016) as Suzume Akamatsu
The World's Longest Photograph (2018) as Atsuko Takenaka
Izanagi Kureta (2020) as Noriko
Napoleon and Me (2021) as Haruko
Death in Tokyo (2021) as Mina
Sexual Drive (2022)
Japanese Style (2022)

Television
The Ancient Dogoo Girl (2010) as Doro-chan
Wakakozake (2015) as Wakako Murasaki
Devil Lover (2015) (Thai TV Series) as Sayaka
Wakakozake Season 2 (2016) as Wakako Murasaki
Wakakozake Season 3 (2017) as Wakako Murasaki

References

External links
  
 
 Rina Takeda Interview

1991 births
Living people
People from Yokohama
Actresses from Kanagawa Prefecture
Actresses from Yokohama
Japanese female karateka
Japanese film actresses
Shōrin-ryū practitioners
Sportspeople from Yokohama
Musicians from Kanagawa Prefecture
Musicians from Yokohama
21st-century Japanese singers
21st-century Japanese women singers